Estadio Kaibil Balam is a football stadium located in Huehuetenango, Guatemala. It is the former home to the football club Deportivo Xinabajul. Its capacity is 10,000.

External links
Fussballtempel.net entry

Kaibil Balam
Huehuetenango Department